Thanasis Dinopapas (born 24 November 1988) is a Greek professional footballer who plays as a forward for Apollon Paralimnio.

Club career 
Dinopapas started playing as an amateur for Achilleas Triandrias, a local team of Thessaloniki in 2007. After a year, he signed a professional contract for Football League team Agrotikos Asteras where he had two full and successful seasons with 51 appearances. This gave him the opportunity to play for Super League club Kerkyra He played for Kerkyra six matches and in July 2011 he was transferred back to his hometown team Anagennisi Epanomis. There he had the most productive season of his career, scoring 5 goals in 24 games. On 19 June 2012, he signed a three-year contract with AEL. On 2 July 2013 due to financial problems, he was released by his team and is currently a free agent. On 13 September 2018, he joined Aittitos Spata on a free transfer.

References

External links 
AEL 1964 FC Official
Player Announcement
Interview
Release by AEL 1964

1988 births
Living people
Greek footballers
Athlitiki Enosi Larissa F.C. players
Agrotikos Asteras F.C. players
Panelefsiniakos F.C. players
Apollon Paralimnio F.C. players
Association football forwards
Footballers from Thessaloniki